Ikale or old Ikale local government is Yoruba tribes in Ondo state Nigeria.It originally included what is now irele Local government. Which was split into Irele and Okitipupa local government.
Irele is a Local Government Area in Ondo State, Nigeria. Its headquarters are in the town of Ode-Irele.

The rulers of Ikale kingdom
Abodi of Ikale land Paramount Rulers of Ikale land
Olofun Of Irele
Odogbo Of Omi
Larogbo Of Akotogbo
Ababa Of Ajagba
Laragunshin Of Iyansan
Lighogho Of Iju-osun
The postal code of the area is 352.

Notes and references

Local Government Areas in Ondo State